Joseph Kpobie is a British actor, who played Juley Smith in the popular BBC soap opera EastEnders. He joined the show in 2002 and was axed in early 2005 after his character was criticised for being too stereotypical. Joseph was brought back in September and was involved in his first big storyline when his character got involved in a romance with a much younger girl (Ruby Allen) but since the end of the storyline he rarely was involved in any other storylines and therefore became a background character. Almost a year after returning, Kpobie had left the show again after a mutual decision was made with the producers that his character had reached a natural end.

He also had a regular role in the drama series Grange Hill playing school bully Mick Daniels from 1992 to 1993.

External links

Year of birth missing (living people)
Living people
English male soap opera actors
English people of Ghanaian descent
English male child actors
Black British male actors